Peter Foley  (born 10 September 1956) is a retired footballer who played as striker. Born in England, he went on to captain the Republic of Ireland U18 and U21 national teams. He was selected to represent the Republic of Ireland at full international level, however injuries and a clash of fixtures with his club prevented him from doing so. After retirement he managed semi-professional clubs around Oxfordshire and Berkshire.

Career
Born in Bicester, England, Folery was spotted playing for Bardwell Boys in a Cup final by Oxford United manager Gerry Summers. He is Oxford United's joint fourth leading goalscorer of all time (behind Graham Atkinson, Tony Jones, James Constable), along with John Aldridge with 90 goals in 306+15 apps. He also captained the Republic of Ireland under-21 national team and had to pull out of playing against Malta for the first team due to Oxford playing a vital league match the same evening and the club would not release him to represent his country.

He also played for Gillingham, on loan from Oxford, Bulova in Hong Kong, Iggesund HIF in Sweden and Exeter City.

He later managed at non-league level taking Isthmian League Premier Division side Marlow to the 3rd round proper of the FA Cup beating his old club Oxford United 2–0 in the first round. It was the first time in the club's history that they had beaten a league side.

After football
Following his retirement, Foley worked at Sellafield nuclear site, as well as being active as a trade union official within the GMB (including being President of its National Race Committee) and Show Racism the Red Card.

In the 2003 New Year Honours, Foley was appointed a Member of the Order of the British Empire (MBE) for services to race relations.

This refers to a different Peter Foley, a footballer at Workington, Scunthorpe and Chesterfield.

References

External links
 

1957 births
Living people
People from Bicester
English people of Irish descent
English footballers
Association football forwards
Republic of Ireland under-21 international footballers
English Football League players
Oxford United F.C. players
Gillingham F.C. players
Bulova SA players
Aldershot F.C. players
Witney Town F.C. players
Exeter City F.C. players
Oxford City F.C. players
English football managers
Oxford City F.C. managers
Marlow F.C. managers
Brackley Town F.C. managers
Didcot Town F.C. managers
English expatriate footballers
Expatriate sportspeople in Hong Kong
Expatriate footballers in Hong Kong
Expatriate footballers in China
Members of the Order of the British Empire